The Uzeyir Hajibeyov International Music Festival is held in September, since 2009, in Azerbaijan. Musical events are held in several cities of Azerbaijan, and the main ceremonies take place in Baku.

History 
Since 1995, September 18 (Uzeyir Hajibeyov's birthday) was celebrated as National Music Day in Azerbaijan. Beginning in 2009, it was decided to hold the International Music Festival devoted to well-known Azerbaijani composer Uzeyir Hajibeyov's creativity.

Overview 
The festival usually lasts 10 days. Events are conducted in different venues including National Art Museum of Azerbaijan, Azerbaijan State Philharmonic Hall, Azerbaijan Opera and Ballet Theatre, International Mugham Center, Azerbaijan State Academic Music Theatre, Baku Music Academy, Heydar Aliyev Palace in Baku, as well as in different regions of Azerbaijan.

Musicians from other countries participate at the festival side-by-side with Azerbaijani musicians. Performances made on the basis of Uzeyir Hajibeyov's compositions and scientific conferences called upon to learn Hajibeyov's creative heritage are organized besides concerts. The organizers of the festival are the Ministry of Culture and Tourism and the Heydar Aliyev Foundation.

Timeline

References

Music festivals in Azerbaijan
Culture in Baku
Tourist attractions in Baku
Autumn events in Azerbaijan